Moshe Gariani (born 18 June 1957) is a former Israeli international footballer.

Playing career 
As a member of the Israel national football team, Gariani impressed manager Alan Mullery in a friendly match against Brighton & Hove Albion. He was subsequently signed but made just one appearance for the club in a match against Southampton in 1980.

Honours
 Championships: 1977–78, 1979–80, 1982–83
 Israel State Cup: 1978, 1987, 1988
 Toto Cup: 1982–83, 1983–84
 Israeli Supercup: 1978, 1983
 UEFA Intertoto Cup: 1978, 1983, 1984

References

External links
 

1957 births
Living people
Israeli footballers
Israel international footballers
Association football defenders
Maccabi Netanya F.C. players
Brighton & Hove Albion F.C. players
Israeli expatriate footballers
Maccabi Tel Aviv F.C. players
Maccabi Yavne F.C. players
Liga Leumit players
English Football League players
Expatriate footballers in England
Israeli expatriate sportspeople in England